Matilde Josephine Moisant (September 13, 1878 – February 5, 1964) was an American pioneer aviator, the second woman in the United States to obtain a pilot's license.

Early life 
Moisant was born on September 13, 1878 in Earl Park, Indiana, to Médore Moisant and Joséphine Fortier. Both places exist in records, but her license from the Aero Club of America shows Earl Park. Both parents were French Canadians. Her siblings include George, John, Annie M., Alfred Moisant, Louise J. and Eunice Moisant. John and Alfred were also aviators. In 1880, the family was living in Manteno, Illinois, and her father was working as a farmer.

Career 
Moisant learned to fly at Alfred's Moisant Aviation School on Long Island, New York. On 13 August 1911, a few weeks after her friend Harriet Quimby received her pilot's certificate, Matilde Moisant became the second woman pilot certified by the Aero Club of America. She pursued a career in exhibition flying, known as barn storming.

Retirement 
Moisant stopped flying on April 14, 1912 in Wichita Falls, Texas when her plane crashed (the same day that the Titanic struck an iceberg). A few months later on 1 July 1912, her friend Harriet Quimby was killed when she was thrown from her plane. Although Moisant recovered from her injuries, she gave up flying. During World War I she volunteered at the front in France. She spent several years dividing her time between the U.S. and the family plantation in El Salvador, before returning to the Los Angeles area.

Death 
Matilde Moisant died in 1964 in Glendale, California, aged 85, and was interred in the Portal of Folded Wings Shrine to Aviation in Valhalla Memorial Park Cemetery, North Hollywood, Los Angeles, California.

Timeline 
1878 Birth in Indiana
1880 Living in Manteno, Kankakee, Illinois
1880 US Census in Manteno, Illinois
1900 US Census in California
1910 Death of her brother
1911 Received pilot's certificate
1911 Won Rodman-Wanamaker altitude trophy
1912 Crash in Texas on April 14
1920 Living in Los Angeles, California
1920 US Census in Los Angeles, California
1930 US Census in La Crescenta, California
1964 Death in California
1964 Burial In Valhalla Memorial Park Cemetery

References

Citations

Bibliography

Further reading 
 New York Times; May 11, 1911; p. 6; "Woman in trousers daring aviator. Long Island Folk Discover That Miss Harriet Quimby Is Making Flights at Garden City. Garden City, Long Island; May 10, 1911. Rumors that there was a young woman aviator at the Moisant Aviation School here who made daily flights at 4:30 A.M. have brought many Garden City folk and townspeople from Hempstead and Mineola to the flying grounds here on several mornings. These early risers have seen a slender, youthful figure in aviation jacket and trousers of wool-backed satin, with ..."
 New York Times; Oct 09, 1911; p. 1; "Escapes sheriff in her aeroplane; Matilde Moisant Takes to the Air Before He Can Arrest Her. Matilde Moisant, who became America's most notable woman flier after seeing her brother, the late John B. Moisant, make his celebrated flight around the Statue of Liberty, narrowly missed being thrown into jail yesterday in Nassau County for going into the air in her monoplane on Sunday."
 Oakes, C. M.: United States Women in Aviation Through World War I; Smithsonian Institution Press, 1978.
 Rich, D. L.: The Magnificent Moisants – Champions of Early Flight; Smithsonian Institution Press, 1998. .

External links 

Hargrave: Matilde Moisant
Smithsonian: Matilde Moisant

1878 births
1964 deaths
American aviation record holders
American women aviation record holders
American people of French-Canadian descent
American women in World War I
Aviators from Indiana
Burials at Valhalla Memorial Park Cemetery
Members of the Early Birds of Aviation
People from Benton County, Indiana
People from Greater Los Angeles